William Ramsey (September 7, 1779 – September 29, 1831) was a member of the U.S. House of Representatives from Pennsylvania.

William Ramsey born at Sterretts Gap, Pennsylvania.  He was appointed surveyor for Cumberland County, Pennsylvania, in 1803, and served as clerk of the orphans’ court of Cumberland County.  He studied law, was admitted to the bar and commenced practice in Carlisle, Pennsylvania.

Ramsey was elected to the Twentieth Congress; reelected as a Jacksonian to the Twenty-first and Twenty-second Congresses and served until his death in Carlisle.  Interment in Ashland Cemetery.

See also
List of United States Congress members who died in office (1790–1899)

Sources

The Political Graveyard

External links 
 

Pennsylvania lawyers
People from Carlisle, Pennsylvania
1779 births
1831 deaths
Jacksonian members of the United States House of Representatives from Pennsylvania
19th-century American politicians